The following is a list of Incognito Cinema Warriors XP (abbreviated ICWXP), DVD, comic books, and online videos. ICWXP is a post-apocalyptic zombie comedy DVD and web series created by Rikk Wolf and produced by Agonywolf Media. The first season of the show follows the same "host segment-movie segment" format that MST3k established, while featuring completely original characters and plot. The second season is more plot-driven and riffs short films as opposed to full-length movies.

Incognito Cinema Warriors DVD Series 

Season one consists of 4 feature-length episodes, and mostly revolve around the movie being presented rather than an over-stretching plot. Creator Rikk Wolf has said that he would like to go back and remake the first episode as well as make two additional episodes to finish the season but doubts that he would be able to find the time.

Upon completion Season Two will have 6 full episodes and two mini episodes. The length of the season two episodes very, and are more plot driven than the first season. The movie segments have been scale back and replaced with shorts. The gap between season one and season two is covered in the official ICWXP comic book.

ICWXP: The Non-Motion Picture 

ICWXP: The Non-Motion Picture is a comic book series intended to bridge the 5-year gap between Season 1 and 2 of the DVD series. There is a total of two issues available on the Agonywolf Media website, with a third with an unknown release date. The contents of The Non-Motion Picture are a lot more action based than the DVD series or the online gaming spin-off and follow Rick and the Bots as they attempt to escape the Cine-A-Sorrow Theater.

Incognito Gaming Warriors/Robot Co-Op 

The ICWXP YouTube channel was mainly used for advertising of DVDs and fan interaction until 2015 when Let's Plays featuring the ICWXP characters launched as "Let's Riffs" under the title "Incognito Gaming Warriors XP". The first of these to be uploaded to the channel was a 10 part play-through of Resident Evil HD Remaster. These "Let's Riffs" are done in the same silhouetted style as their DVD series, and range from 35 to 90 minutes. They have had a collaboration with James Rolfe (AVGN) where they riffed a game trailer for Super Mario Odyssey. They have covered many games in this series, including Resident Evil HD Remaster, Hitman, and Fallout 4. They also had a short-lived Let's Riff called "Playing With Myself" series where Rikk would play Mega Man, Monster Party, and Demon Quest with a clone of himself named Rick. In May 2017 IGWXP starting doing a series on Resident Evil 7: Biohazard. that consisted of 90-minute episodes with host segments that pertain to the Resident Evil franchise. Rikk Wolf has stated in a DVD commentary for Episode 205 that he has grown to prefer the riffing style of IGWXP over ICWXP because they can interact with the material better with a game rather than a movie.  In October 2017, Agonywolf Media held a poll to change the name of IGWXP to help feather themselves from MST3k. "Robot Co-Op" was the winning poll option, and the Agonywolf Media crew began uploading new "Let's Riffs" with a face-cam style opposed to the silhouette on the new "Robot Co-Op" YouTube channel. Agonywolf Media produces at least one "Let's Riff" a month under the IGWXP (Now Robot-Co-Op) logo to fill in the time between the long stretches between the DVD episodes and to serve as paid content to their Patreon supporters.

References 

Mystery Science Theater 3000
Lists of American comedy television series episodes